Manitou Lake  is a salt lake located mostly in the RM of Manitou Lake No. 422 in the Canadian province of Saskatchewan, about  away from the provincial border with Alberta. The eastern shore of the lake is in the RM of Hillsdale No. 440. Manitou Lake is located in a region called the Prairie Pothole Region of North America, which extends throughout three Canadian provinces and five U.S. states. It is also within Palliser's Triangle and the Great Plains ecoregion.

Because the lake is an endorheic lake and quite salty, there are no fish in the lake. Manitou Island in the centre of the lake is now connected to the southern shore as the water level has lowered.

Description
The primary inflow for the lake is from Eyehill Creek at the south end. There are also many small springtime meltwater tributaries that feed the lake. Eyehill Creek originates in neighbouring Alberta from Sounding Lake, which in turn is fed by Sounding Creek. Manitou Lake and its tributaries are part of a closed basin watershed. When the lake level rises high enough, it overflows to the north through Wells Lake near Marsden and then into the Battle River, which is a tributary of the North Saskatchewan River. This has happened only once since settlers arrived in the area, and that was in approximately 1905.

Lake levels were relatively constant until 1980 and have been declining rapidly since then by approximately one metre every six years. Less annual snowfall and heavier utilization of water from the Eyehill Creek system by urban, industrial, and agricultural users is blamed for this trend.

Along the southern shore of the lake are the Manitou Sand Hills. The hills total  of Crown grazing land set aside by the Saskatchewan government.

There are no communities on the lake's shore. The nearest communities are Marsden, 
At the lake's North-West Bay, there is Big Manitou Regional Park. Originally founded as part of Suffern Lake Regional Park in 1975, it became its own indepenant regional park in 2019. The park features camping, cabins, picnicking, swimming, and the Manitou Lake Golf Club. Just to the east of the regional park, is Manitou Lake Bible Camp.

See also
List of lakes of Saskatchewan
Salt lake

References

External links 

Lakes of Saskatchewan
Manitou Lake No. 442, Saskatchewan
Endorheic lakes of Canada
Division No. 13, Saskatchewan
Saline lakes of Canada
Important Bird Areas of Saskatchewan